Blue Thunder is a 1983 film that features a high-tech helicopter of the same name.

Blue Thunder may also refer to:
 Blue Thunder (2015 film), a 2015 short film
 Blue Thunder (drumline), a drumline performing for the Seattle Seahawks football team
 Blue Thunder (helicopter), the titular helicopter of the film and TV series
 Blue Thunder (truck), a monster truck currently racing in the USHRA Monster Jam series
 Blue Thunder (TV series), a 1984 TV series follow-up to the film
 McKinney Blue Thunder, a former baseball team in McKinney, Texas
 "Blue Thunder", a 1989 song by Galaxie 500 from On Fire